Cerdanya is a comarca in northern Catalonia, in the Pyrenees, on the border of Catalonia with France and Andorra. Within Catalonia, Cerdanya is divided between Catalan provinces of Girona and Lleida. Cerdanya's neighbouring comarques are Alt Urgell, Berguedà, and Ripollès.

Cerdanya is in the "vegueria" of Alt Pirineu, according to "Vegueries of Catalonia law".

The area is sometimes called Baixa Cerdanya (literally "Lower Cerdanya") to distinguish it from Alta Cerdanya ("Upper Cerdanya") which was ceded to France by the Treaty of the Pyrenees in 1659.

Can be distinguished the "subcomarques" of la Batllia or petita Cerdanya, and el Baridà.

Llívia in Cerdanya is a Catalan exclave, completely surrounded by French territory.

Municipalities

References

Literature
Peter Sahlins, Boundaries. The Making of France and Spain in the Pyrenees (Berkeley: Univ. of California Press, 1989).

External links
Official comarcal web site
Information about Baixa Cerdanya on the site of the Generalitat de Catalunya (in Catalan)

 
Comarques of the Province of Lleida
Comarques of the Province of Girona
Pyrenees